Copperas Mine Fork is a tributary of Island Creek,  long, in southern West Virginia in the United States. The Copperas Mine Fork's entire course and drainage area are in Logan County.

See also
List of rivers of West Virginia

References 

Rivers of West Virginia
Tributaries of the Guyandotte River
Rivers of Logan County, West Virginia